Metropolitan Avenue is a major east-west street in Queens and northern Brooklyn, New York City. Its western end is at the East River in Williamsburg, Brooklyn, and the eastern end at Jamaica Avenue in Jamaica, Queens. The avenue was constructed in 1816 as the Williamsburgh and Jamaica Turnpike, though previously it served as an Indian trail.

There are also streets named Metropolitan Avenue in Staten Island and the Bronx.

History
In 1814, the Williamsburgh Turnpike Company was chartered to upgrade an old Indian trail from Jamaica to the East River into a road, and their work was carried out in 1816. Locally known as the Williamsburgh and Jamaica Turnpike, what became Metropolitan Avenue was a toll road which connected the then villages of Williamsburgh (as it was originally spelled) and Jamaica, New York. The road became a farmer's and stage coach route to the Williamsburgh ferries across the East River to Manhattan. The easternmost segment of the present avenue in Williamsburg initially had several names  before it was joined to Metropolitan Avenue circa 1858: Bushwick Street, then Woodhull Street, and, later, North Second Street. The City of Brooklyn acquired Metropolitan Avenue from the Williamsburgh Turnpike Road Company in 1872. Several of the neighborhoods through which it passes originated as villages along its length.

Route description
Metropolitan Avenue runs mainly through the neighborhoods of Williamsburg and East Williamsburg in Brooklyn and Ridgewood, Maspeth, Middle Village, Glendale, Forest Hills, Kew Gardens, Richmond Hill and Jamaica in Queens. The avenue, which ranges between four and six lanes wide, marks the northern borders of Ridgewood and Glendale and the southern border of Maspeth; it also splits Middle Village and passes through Forest Park.

Transportation

Metropolitan Avenue is served by the following subway stations:
 Metropolitan Avenue on the IND Crosstown Line ( train)
 Lorimer Street and Graham Avenue on the BMT Canarsie Line (L train)
 Middle Village – Metropolitan Avenue on the BMT Myrtle Avenue Line ( train)
 Jamaica – Van Wyck  on the IND Archer Avenue Line ( train)
The Q54 bus runs along most of the avenue.

The avenue crosses the Long Island Rail Road's Bushwick Branch at one of the busiest level crossings in New York City.

Education
Queens Metropolitan High School, a public high school, opened in 2010 on the avenue in Forest Hills.

Other Metropolitan Avenues

Aileen B. Ryan Oval, formerly Metropolitan Oval, is halfway along Metropolitan Avenue in the Bronx.

References

Streets in Brooklyn
Streets in Queens, New York